The Little River is a perennial river of the West Gippsland catchment, located in the Alpine region of the Australian state of Victoria.

Location and features
The Little River rises in remote country in the southern portion of the Avon Wilderness Park, south of Mount Hump, part of the Great Dividing Range within the Alpine National Park. The river flows generally southwest, then northwest, then southwest, then south, before reaching its confluence with the Ben Cruachan Creek within the Shire of Wellington. The Ben Cruachan Creek flows into the Avon River. Little River descends  over its  course.

See also

 Rivers of Victoria

References

External links
 
 

West Gippsland catchment
Rivers of Gippsland (region)